OOHDM (Object-Oriented Hypermedia Design Method) is a method for the development of Web applications. 
It was one of the first methods to postulate the separation of concerns that defines its various models – requirements, conceptual, navigation, abstract interface and implementation. OOHDM, and its successor, SHDM (Semantic Hypermedia Design Method, which uses Semantic Web models) are supported by an open source, freely available environment, HyperDE.

See also 
 Web engineering
 Web modeling

External links

 OOHDM Wiki
 HyperDE.

Software architecture
Web applications
Web development